Jakub Šural (born 1 July 1996) is a Czech football player who currently plays for FC Zbrojovka Brno. He is the younger brother of Josef Šural a footballer who died in an accident in Alanya, Turkey.

References

External links
 Profile at FC Zbrojovka Brno official site
 

1996 births
Living people
Czech footballers
Czech First League players
FC Zbrojovka Brno players
SK Líšeň players
Association football midfielders
FK Baník Most players
Czech National Football League players
Czech Republic youth international footballers
Footballers from Brno